John Both Puok (c. 1963 – January 9, 2012) was a South Sudanese politician. After the 2010 election, he served as Minister of Agriculture in the Unity state. Prior to being appointed minister, Puok had served as a member of the Unity state council of the Sudan People's Liberation Movement. He died on January 9, 2012, whilst undergoing treatment for lung cancer in India. He was 48.

References

Sudan People's Liberation Movement politicians
2012 deaths
Year of birth uncertain
People from Unity (state)
Deaths from lung cancer in India